The Gottstein Futurity is a race for Thoroughbred horses run annually at Emerald Downs racetrack in Auburn, Washington. The mile and one-sixteenth race is open to two-year-old horses of either sex and is run as part of the year's closing racecard.

History
First run in 1940 at Longacres Racetrack in Renton as the Washington State Futurity, in 1993 the race was moved to Yakima Meadows in Yakima and to its present location in 1996. There was no race held in 1943 due to various federal government wartime restrictions.

The Futurity was renamed in 1971 to honor Joseph Gottstein (1891–1971), a racehorse owner as well as the builder and proprietor of Longacres Racetrack about whom the widely respected turf writer and founding president of the National Turf Writers Association Joe Hirsch called "one of the great figures in racetrack management".

Chronology of race names:
Washington Futurity: 1940–1970
Joe Gottstein Washington Futurity: 1971
Joe Gottstein Futurity: 1972–1995
Gottstein Futurity: 1996–present

Race distances:
 1 1/16 miles : 1987–2011, 2013–present
 1 mile : 2012
 6½ furlongs : 1963–1986
 6 furlongs :  1950–1962
 5½ furlongs :  1940–1949

The Futurity was run in two divisions in 1958, 1960 and 1963.

Records
 In 2004 Positive Prize set the fastest time for this race with a winning time of 1:41 2/5.
 In 2009 Koala Beach recorded the widest margin of victory at 8 lengths.

Most wins by a jockey:
 4 – Gallyn Mitchell (2000, 2002, 2009, 2010)

Most wins by a trainer:
 7 – Bud Klokstad (1986, 1989, 1990, 1992, 1997, 2000, 2003)

Winners 
Emerald Downs 2018 Media Guide and race history:

* My Constant Star was disqualified from purse money in 1997.

References

Flat horse races for two-year-olds
Open middle distance horse races
Emerald Downs
Horse races in Washington (state)
Auburn, Washington
Recurring sporting events established in 1940
1940 establishments in Washington (state)